Soltan Migitinov (17 September 1988, Lipetsk) is an Azerbaijani boxer who competes as a middleweight. At the 2012 Summer Olympics he defeated Mohamed Hikal in the first round of the Men's middleweight, before losing to Esquiva Falcão in the second round.

References

Azerbaijani male boxers
Living people
Olympic boxers of Azerbaijan
Boxers at the 2012 Summer Olympics
Middleweight boxers
1988 births

People from Lipetsk Oblast
21st-century Azerbaijani people